Johannes Märtson (25 August 1868 Lõve Parish (now Tõrva Parish), Kreis Fellin – 9 January 1935 Tõrva) was an Estonian politician. He was a member of I Riigikogu. He was a member of the Riigikogu since 11 February 1921. He replaced Hugo Rahamägi.

References

1868 births
1935 deaths
People from Tõrva Parish
People from Kreis Fellin
Christian People's Party (Estonia) politicians
Members of the Riigikogu, 1920–1923
Members of the Riigikogu, 1923–1926
University of Tartu alumni